Delias funerea is a butterfly in the family Pieridae. It was described by Walter Rothschild in 1894. It is found in the Australasian realm.

Subspecies
Delias funerea funerea (Halmahera)
Delias funerea okko Nakano, 1986 (Bachan)
Delias funerea moritai Yagishita, 1994 (Morotai)

References

External links
Delias at Markku Savela's Lepidoptera and Some Other Life Forms

funerea
Butterflies described in 1894